Nawa is a city, tehsil headquarters, panchayat samiti, and a municipality in Nagaur district in the Indian state of Rajasthan. It is the Biggest Salt Market of Rajasthan.

Geography
It has an average elevation of 369 metres (1210 feet). The Nawa City is located at the border of three major district of Rajasthan Jaipur, Ajmer, Sikar. In North of city Arawali mountain's part and in south The Sambhar Lake, In East of town the Turatmati river and in West also Arawali Mountains.

Demographics
 India census, Nawa had a population of 22,088. Males constitute 53% of the population and females 47%. Nawa has an average literacy rate of 65%, higher than the national average of 59.5%: male literacy is 73%, and female literacy is 56%. In Nawa, 16% of the population is under 6 years of age.

Thakurs
The area was granted to Rao Bharmalla Singh, fourth son of Rao Prithviraj Singh II of Sikar. He received it in 1496 AD.

 Rao Bharmalla Singh (1496–1530)
 Rao Amar Singh (1530–1568)
 Rao Teja Singh (1568–1597)
 Rao Sheo Singh (1597–1638)
 Thakur Rao Dhai Singh (1638–1662)
 Thakur Nawab Sawai Khan Kayamkhani (1662–1694)
 Thakur Nawab Bhanwar Khan Kayamkhani (1694–1727)
 Thakur Nawab Dilawar Khan Kayamkhani  (1727–1764)

Schools 
A number of schools are located in Nawa:

 Shree Shyam Bal Niketan Sr Sec School, Nawa City
 Rajasthali Vidyapeeth Sr Sec School, Nawa city
 RVS Academy, Nawa city
 Sharada Bal Niketan Sr Sec School Nawa city
 Vivekanand Sr Sec School Nawa city
 Govt Sr Sec  School, Nawa
 Govt Girls Sr Sec School, Nawa
 Good Shepherd English school,Nawa City
 Adarsh Vidhya Mandir, NAWA CITY
 BAL VIDHYA MANDIR SCHOOL  English medium school, Nawa city
 Jems Academy Best English medium school

Social services (a social samiti organisation and group)

 SHIKSHA Ek Pehal Ek Paryas NGO
 Shree Aashu Lal Vyas Sewa Samiti
 Friends Club 
 Shaheed Bhagat Singh Social Group
 Nawa Social Services Society
 Yuva Muslim Mahasabha 
 Shubhash Sewa Samiti
 Bajrangi Group 
 Ya Mohammad Committee
 Kumawat Sewa Samiti

College
 Government College, Nawa City
 Shaheed Bhagat Singh P.G. College, Nawa City
 Shaheed Bhagat Singh College of Nursing, Nawa City
 Shaheed Bhagat Singh Teacher Training College, Nawa City
 Govt ITI College, Nawa City

Political

Freedom Fighter Shri Kishan Lal Shah was the first M.L.A. (1952–57) and was re-elected for second (1957–62) and fourth Assembly (1967–72).
Shri Hanuman Singh Choudhary was elected for Third Assembly (1962–67) and later on shri Rameshwar Lal Choudhary, Shri Harish Chandra Kumawat (1985-1990, 1990-1992, 1998-2003, 2003-2008) and Shri Mahendra Choudhary, Shri Vijay Singh Choudhary represented the constituency.,
and at present Shri Mahendra Choudhary is M.L.A from Indian National Congress. Shri Mahendra Choudhary is Deputy Chief Whip of 15th Rajasthan Legislative Assembly 2018.

Nawa
MLA - Shree Mahendra Choudhary
SDM - Shree Bramah Lal Jat
Tehsildar - Shree Guru Parshad Tanwar
Nayab Tehsildar - Shree Bharat Singh
CI Police - Satish Meena
Chairperson - Shrimati SaYARI DEVI
Municipality EO - Hemaram Choudhary  
Medical Officer Incharge of Community Health Centre  - Dr Om Singh Shekhawat
Covid -19 Incharge- Dr Saurabh Jain
Main Villages - Rajas, Kherwa Ki Dhani, Aabas genano ki dhani piprali

References

Cities and towns in Nagaur district

Holy Palace 
Shri Balaji mandir(Main Market)
Zama Masjid (Imam chowk)
Madina Masjid (Luhar Mohalla) 
Akbari Masjid (Mohanpura Road)
Digamber Jain temple(Main market)
Dargah Aasiq Ali Peer Baba
Dargah Mustaq Ali Baba
Dargah Kuncha Wale Peer Baba
Alam seth mandir 
Shree jaal ke Balaji mandir
Shree bhivanda nada Balaji temple
Shree sanidev temple
Shree station nada mandir
Shakhmbri Devi temple
Shakhmbri Devi temple in lake
Shree Radhe Krishna temple (ajazad chowk)
Radhe Krishna temple (jogi aasan)
Shri Neminath Digimber Jain Temple (Pipali bazaar) 
Shri Suparasnath Digimber Jain Temple Pipali bazar
shri pipali wale balaji (dakidara mohalla)
shri bakebihari temple main market